GRQ or grq may refer to:

 GRQ, the IATA code for Groningen Airport Eelde, Drenthe, Netherlands
 grq, the ISO 639-3 code for Gorovu language, Papua New Guinea